Nelcyndana is a genus of cicadas in the family Cicadidae, found in southeast Asia and the Philippines. There are about five described species in Nelcyndana.

Nelcyndana is the only genus of the tribe Nelcyndanini.

Species
These five species belong to the genus Nelcyndana:
 Nelcyndana borneensis Duffels, 2010
 Nelcyndana madagascariensis (Distant, 1905)
 Nelcyndana mulu Duffels, 2010
 Nelcyndana tener (Stal, 1870)
 Nelcyndana vantoli Duffels, 2010

References

Further reading

 
 
 
 
 
 
 
 

Cicadettinae
Cicadidae genera